Wendell Andre Carter Jr. (born April 16, 1999) is an American professional basketball player for the Orlando Magic of the National Basketball Association (NBA). He played college basketball for the Duke Blue Devils.

High school career
Carter attended Pace Academy in Atlanta, Georgia, as part of the class of 2017. As a sophomore, he averaged 21.3 points per game, 12.3 rebounds per game, and 4.1 blocks while leading the Knights to a (27–3) record and a Georgia 6AA regional title. Carter would continue to develop his game during the summer of 2015 where he led his AAU team, Georgia Stars, to a Nike Elite Youth Basketball League (EYBL) Peach Jam championship and was named Co-MVP alongside Jared Harper. after his sophomore season, Carter also earned the Georgia Region 6 AA Player of the Year and second-team Atlanta Tipoff Club All Metro-honors.

In his junior season in 2015–16, he averaged 21.6 points per game and 13.6 rebounds per game. In the state finals game, Carter scored 30 points and recorded 20 rebounds to lead Pace Academy to win the 2016 Georgia class AA state Championship. He was named an honorable mention All-American by the Naismith Trophy, a first-team Junior All-American by MaxPreps, the Georgia Class AA Player of the year, the Atlanta/South Fulton Player of the Year, and a first-team all-state selection as a junior. In the spring and summer of 2016, Carter competed for the AAU team, Team CP3 sponsored by Phoenix Suns point guard Chris Paul. He averaged 16.8 points per game and 10.2 rebounds per game on the Nike EYBL Circuit, earning second-team All-EYBL honoree.

As a senior, he averaged 22.7 points, 15.5 rebounds, and 5.8 blocks while leading the Knights to a Georgia class 3A state championship on March 9, 2017.
Carter was named Georgia All-Classification Player of the Year, Gatorade Georgia Player of the Year, first-team All-America honors from the Naismith Trophy, second-team accolades from USA Today, and third-team recognition from MaxPreps. Carter played in the Jordan Brand Classic, Nike Hoop Summit, and the McDonald's All-American Game, where he finished with 10 points, 5 rebounds, and 3 assists.

Off of the court, Carter was named the Morgan Wootten National Player of the Year, which goes to student-athletes who exemplify outstanding character, leadership, and academics. He earned a 3.8 GPA in high school and won his school's Lance and Shield Award as a top scholar-athlete.

Carter was rated as a five-star recruit and the No. 4 overall recruit and No. 1 power forward in the 2017 high school class. Following high school, he was named to the All-Tournament Team of the 2016 FIBA Under-17 World Championship in July 2017. Carter ultimately chose to play at Duke University despite considering the opportunity to enroll and play at Harvard.

College career
Carter played at Duke for one season. On November 18, Carter scored 20 points and 11 rebounds in a 78–61 victory over Southern. On November 20, Carter was named ACC rookie of the week. Against the Indiana Hoosiers, he had a double-double with 18 points and 12 rebounds despite being in foul trouble to lift Duke in a 91–81 win. On December 26, 2017, Carter earned his second ACC rookie of the week honor. On January 20, 2018, Carter tallied 21 points in an 81–54 victory against Pittsburgh. On January 24, 2018,  Carter scored 23 points and 12 rebounds in an 84–70 win over Wake Forest. On February 11, 2018, Carter scored 19 points and 10 rebounds in an 80–69 victory over Georgia Tech. On February 18, 2018, Carter provided 15 points and 10 rebounds in a 66–57 win against Clemson. On February 21, 2018, Carter scored 18 points and 6 assist in a 82–56 win over Louisville. On the season, Carter averaged 13.1 points and 9.1 rebounds per game. Carter had one of the best freshman seasons for a power forward/center  in Duke history where he would finish second all-time for Duke freshman with (335) rebounds, (76) blocked shots and (16) career double-doubles.

Following Duke's loss in the 2018 NCAA men's basketball tournament, Carter announced his intention to forgo his final three seasons of collegiate eligibility and declare for the 2018 NBA draft. Carter was subsequently named both Second team All-ACC and ACC All-Freshman teams.

Professional career

Chicago Bulls (2018–2021)
On June 21, 2018, Carter was selected with the seventh overall pick by the Chicago Bulls. On July 3, 2018, Carter officially signed with the Bulls. On October 18, he made his NBA debut, scoring eight points and recording three rebounds, three assists and a block against the Philadelphia 76ers, Four days later, Carter recorded career-highs in rebounds (9) and assists (4) against the Dallas Mavericks. On October 31, 2018, Carter scored a season high 25 points with eight rebounds, five assists, three blocks and three steals in a 107–108 overtime loss to the Denver Nuggets. He would break that amount on November 30 with 28 points scored in a loss to the Detroit Pistons. On March 24, 2019, Carter was ruled out for the remainder of the season with left thumb surgery.

Orlando Magic (2021–present)
On March 25, 2021, Carter and Otto Porter were traded to the Orlando Magic in exchange for Nikola Vučević and Al-Farouq Aminu. Orlando also received two future first-round draft picks.

On October 16, 2021, Carter signed a four-year, $50 million rookie scale extension with the Magic. On March 20, 2022, Carter scored a career-high 30 points in a 90–85 win against the Oklahoma City Thunder. 

Carter matched his career-high of 30 points in a 116–108 loss on November 1, 2022, against the Oklahoma City Thunder. On December 29, he was suspended by the NBA for one game without pay due to coming off the bench during an altercation in a game against the Detroit Pistons the day before.

National team career
Carter played with the United States U17 team at the FIBA Under-17 Basketball World Cup, where he won gold. As well, he was named to the All-Tournament Team, along with teammate Collin Sexton.

Career statistics

NBA

Regular season

|-
| style="text-align:left;"|
| style="text-align:left;"|Chicago
| 44 || 44 || 25.2 || .485 || .188 || .795 || 7.0 || 1.8 || .6 || 1.3 || 10.3
|-
| style="text-align:left;"|
| style="text-align:left;"|Chicago
| 43 || 43 || 29.2 || .534 || .207 || .737 || 9.4 || 1.2 || .8 || .8 || 11.3
|-
| style="text-align:left;"|
| style="text-align:left;"|Chicago
| 32 || 25 || 24.8 || .512 || .364 || .739 || 7.8 || 2.2 || .6 || .8 || 10.9
|-
| style="text-align:left;"|
| style="text-align:left;"|Orlando
| 22 || 19 || 26.5 || .493 || .241 || .721 || 8.8 || 1.6 || .8 || .8 || 11.7
|-
| style="text-align:left;"|
| style="text-align:left;"|Orlando
| 62 || 61 || 29.9 || .525 || .327 || .691 || 10.5 || 2.8 || .6 || .7 || 15.0
|- class="sortbottom"
| style="text-align:center;" colspan="2"|Career
| 203 || 192 || 27.6 || .513 || .298 || .731 || 8.9 || 2.0 || .6 || .9 || 12.2

College

|-
| style="text-align:left;"|2017–18
| style="text-align:left;"|Duke
| 37 || 37 || 26.8 || .561 || .413 || .738 || 9.1 || 2.0 || .8 || 2.1 || 13.5

Personal life
Wendell's father, Wendell Sr., played professional basketball in the Dominican Republic after playing college basketball at Delta State. His mother, Kylia Carter, played basketball at the University of Mississippi. Carter Jr.'s parents stressed academics to him from a young age, ultimately culminating in his interest in a school like Duke University. On February 23, 2018 Carter was 1 of 25 college players identified in an FBI investigation as having received impermissible benefits as a college athlete as a result of his mother allegedly having had her lunch paid for by an agent nine months before he signed to play for Duke.

References

External links
 
 Duke Blue Devils bio
 247 Sports bio

1999 births
Living people
21st-century African-American sportspeople
African-American basketball players
American men's basketball players
Basketball players from Atlanta
Centers (basketball)
Chicago Bulls draft picks
Chicago Bulls players
Duke Blue Devils men's basketball players
McDonald's High School All-Americans
Orlando Magic players
Pace Academy alumni
Power forwards (basketball)